Farhad Aslani (born June 8, 1966) is an Iranian actor.

Early life and career 
Aslani was born in Bijar although he grew up in Tehran, and was recognized for his impersonation skills at an early age. Aslani played his first role in The Blue-Veiled by Rakhshan Bani Etemad in 1995.
Aslani won Crystal Simorgh for illustrious played his role in Private Life movie at the Fajr Film Festival 2012. Aslani in 2011 played the Different role of Ibn Ziyad in Mokhtarnameh Tv series. He played at the Daughter movie by Reza Mir-Karimi and won the Best Actor Award at Moscow International Film Festival 2016. He won the IFFI Best Actor Award (Male) at the 47th International Film Festival of India.

Controversy

Allegations of sexual misconduct 
On 23 March 2022, assistant director Somaye Mirshamsi stated on Twitter that she had been "sexually harassed" and "violently treated" by Farhad Aslani while working on a film directed by Hatef Alimardani. At the time of the incident, Aslani was allegedly and "took her hand and asked Ms. Mirshamsi to kiss his face". Avazeh Shahnaz, a filmmaker and director, also said that she had a "similar experience" with Aslani. On 28 March 2022, the Tehran Association of Film Assistant Directors issued a statement, emphasizing Mirshamsi's "honesty", and added "This is not the first time that psychological insecurity and even physical threats and confrontations have taken place behind the scenes of the Iranian film industry, and in order to eradicate this inhumane practice, radical, serious and inter-union coordination is needed."

Filmography

Cinema
 The Blue Veiled 1995
 Safar be Chazabeh 1996
 Bashgah-e Seri 2000
 Asemane Por Setareh 2000
 Movie Mania 2000
 Ghoroob Shod, Bia 2004
 Istgahe Behesht 2006
 The Reward of Silence 2007
 End of the road 2007
 Heiran 2009
 Thirteen 59 2011
 A Cube of Sugar 2011
 I am a Mother 2012
 Private Life 2012
 The Bear 2012
 The Wooden Bridge 2012
 Be Khatreh Pooneh 2013
 Tales 2014
 Dreamy 2014
 Sakene Tabaghe ye Vasat 2014
 Mastaneh 2014
 Kalashnikov 2014
 Ice Age 2015
 Time of Love 2015
 The Nameless Alley 2016
 Daughter 2016
 Under the Smoky Roof 2017
 Beautiful Jinn 2017
 Sheeple 2018
 Columbus 2018
 Just 6.5 2019
 Playing with Stars 2021
 Leila's Brothers 2022

TV series
 The Monster
 Rebel
King of Ear
 Mokhtarnameh
 Rahe Bipayan (Endless Path)
 Vafa
 Khane Dar Tariki
 Police Javan
 Dastane Yek Shar
 The English Briefcase
 Pezeshkan
 Khaterate Yek Khabarnegar
 Safar Be Chazzabeh
 Kharere Ha
 Cheshe-e-Sevom
 Khane Dar Atash
 Baharan Dar Bahar
 Hamsaye Ha
 Imam Ali

Telefilm
 Shakh Be Shakh

References

External links 

Iranian male film actors
Iranian male stage actors
IFFI Best Actor (Male) winners
Iranian male television actors
1966 births
Living people
People from Kurdistan Province
Male actors from Tehran
Crystal Simorgh for Best Actor winners